Eastling is a small village 4½ miles to the southwest of Faversham, Kent in England. It is set in a designated Area of Outstanding Natural Beauty on the slope of the North Downs.

The village's Conservation Area boasts some excellent buildings and gardens, and the Eastling Manor House.

St Mary's Church 

The village church of St Mary's is believed to have been built on the foundations of an earlier place of worship before the 11th century. The oldest surviving parts are the base of the southwest tower, the nave and the western part of the chancel. 
The chancel was extended eastwards in the 14th century to create a sanctuary. About the same time, the St Katherine Chapel and an arcade was added to the southeast corner.

The nave, north aisle and south arcade were substantially rebuilt by the architect R.C. Hussey in 1855–56; the west porch added and the nave re-roofed. St Mary's box pews, pulpit, lectern, rector's stall and choir stalls all date from that era.

Eastling school 

Eastling County Primary School opened on Kettle Hill on 7 February 1881 with 80 children. The first head was Bessie Higham; since February 2002 it has been Dave Walsh. It replaced a schoolhouse built before 1842 in Newnham Lane and which doubled as a church hall.

Currently (January 2020) the school  has a roll fluctuating around 100 pupils with spaces for 15 new pupils each year at ages 4 and 5.

Transport 
A public bus service (the number 660) links the village to Faversham, every day except Sundays.

References

External links

Eastling Village website

Villages in Kent
Borough of Swale
Civil parishes in Kent